KBEN (103.3 FM) is a radio station broadcasting a Classic Country format. Licensed to Cowley, Wyoming and serving the Big Horn Basin, the station is owned by White Park Broadcasting, Inc.

References

External links
 103.3 The Range Online
 

Classic country radio stations in the United States
BEN-FM
Big Horn County, Wyoming
Radio stations established in 1968
1968 establishments in Wyoming